Angela Robyn Lambert  (born 1 February 1981, in Toowoomba) was an Australian Women's Field Hockey player. She captained the under 21 Australian women's field hockey squad before entering the Hockeyroos in 1998 and in 2000 won gold at the Sydney Olympics. Angie went on to play in two more Olympic games and played over 225 games for Australia. Apart from playing in the Hockeyroos she played for the AHL Queensland Scorchers.

The youngest of the local Australian Representatives, Skirving began playing hockey at the age of 12 and was selected in the Queensland no.1 Rep. team when 13. She debuted for the Hockeyroos at 17. In 2001 she was named the winner of the International Hockey's Junior Player of the year. In that same year Angie was awarded the Order of Australia Medal OAM for services to sport in Australia.  Skirving married Australian Kookaburras goalie Stephen Lambert (field hockey) in December 2006. The pair have been described as Australia's Golden Couple of Hockey.

In 2015 Lambert was named in the Queensland Scorchers Team of the Decade (2005-2015). and in 2019 was added to the QAS Hall Of Fame.

Skirving is the hockey co-ordinator at Morteon Bay College, where she also works as a teacher. Skirving is currently playing in the Brisbane Premier League 1 competition for Ascot Women's Hockey Club as a player coach winning Premierships in 2017 and 2021.

References

External links
 
 Profile

1981 births
Australian female field hockey players
Olympic field hockey players of Australia
Olympic gold medalists for Australia
Field hockey players at the 2006 Commonwealth Games
Field hockey players at the 2000 Summer Olympics
Field hockey players at the 2004 Summer Olympics
Field hockey players at the 2008 Summer Olympics
Living people
Commonwealth Games gold medallists for Australia
Commonwealth Games bronze medallists for Australia
Olympic medalists in field hockey
Medalists at the 2000 Summer Olympics
Recipients of the Medal of the Order of Australia